Tacho (meaning pot or pan), also known as Chau-Chau Pele, is considered to be a Macanese variant of Cozido à Portuguesa that is found in Portuguese cuisine.

History
Tacho is considered to be a winter dish, and can take up to three days to prepare. It is often eaten during the holidays, and symbolizes familial unity.

At least one account states that Tacho began as a dish made with leftover ingredients from holiday feasts.

In the past, Tacho was seen as a dish consumed by wealthy people. It is considered to be a relatively rare dish, even in the present day.

Ingredients
Even though there are variations depending on recipes, Tacho is, in general, noted to have swapped the Chouriços that is found in Cozido with Chinese sausage, and the turnips found in Cozido with Daikon. Some Tachos include Pork rind, Pig's trotters, and Balichão. One recipe also calls for the use of fish maw.

References

Macanese cuisine